Wesley Norwood Jones (July 2, 1852 – October 20, 1928) was an American politician who served as the first North Carolina Commissioner of Labor.

Early life and education 
Jones was born on July 2, 1852, in Wake County, North Carolina. He was apprenticed as a printer at 13 years old. In the fall of 1875, he enrolled at Wake Forest University, graduating in 1879.

North Carolina Commissioner of Labor
While serving as a member of the board of aldermen (equivalent of the later city council) of Raleigh, Jones was appointed to the new office of North Carolina Commissioner of Labor by Governor Alfred M. Scales on March 15, 1887, for a two-year term. When his term expired, Governor Daniel G. Fowle replaced him with John C. Scarborough.

Death
Jones was found dead in his bed in Raleigh on October 20, 1928.

References 

1852 births
1928 deaths
North Carolina Commissioners of Labor
People from Raleigh, North Carolina